Assem Hammoud, aka Amir Andalousi, a Beirut native, is an alleged Al Qaeda operative living in Lebanon who was charged with plotting a mission to blow up the Downtown Hudson Tubes beneath the Hudson River between New Jersey and lower Manhattan, New York City, United States with a team of suicide bombers with backpack explosives.

Some U.S. counterterrorism officials cast doubt on the significance of the alleged plot and some authorities questioned first reports  that appeared in the New York Daily News, that terrorists sought to flood Lower Manhattan and the Financial District by bombing tunnels. They said there was no evidence that the plotters had taken any actions, such as buying explosives or sending money. 
Two U.S. counterterrorism officials, speaking to The Washington Post, discounted the ability of the conspirators to carry out an attack.

He was arrested by the Lebanese Armed Forces, a division of the Internal Security Forces (ISF), in the Mouseitbeh area of west Beirut on April 27, 2006. The announcement of his capture was made July 7, 2006 by FBI Assistant Director Mark J. Mershon.
Press reports on Tuesday, March 17, 2009, advised that he had been released on bail back in June, 2008.

Hudson River bomb plot 

Homeland Security chief Michael Chertoff said "It was never a concern that this would actually be executed ... We were, as I say, all over this."

Background 

Hammoud's nom de guerre, Amir Andalousi, means "Spanish Prince," and refers to the time when Spain, or Al-Andalus, was under Muslim control.  From interviews with his mother, the family is reported to have migrated to Lebanon from Spain in the year 800.

Hammoud is said to be either a professor of economics or computer science at the Lebanese International University.  He studied finance and economics in Canada in the late 1990s for six years. He speaks English, French and German, in addition to Arabic.

His mother, Nabila Qotob (b. 1948), who lives in Beirut's upscale Clemenceau neighborhood, has denied her son's involvement with Al Qaeda.  His mother says he drives a 1965 MG.

Hammoud has two brothers, one is studying in Canada and another works in the United Arab Emirates. One brother's name is Ramsey (36).

References

External links
Lebanese arrest suspect in New York bomb plot; The Daily Star (Lebanon), July 8, 2006.

1975 births
Living people
Lebanese people imprisoned abroad
Prisoners and detainees of the United States federal government
Canadian Muslims